Timothy R. Whelan is a former member of the Massachusetts House of Representatives. He was sworn in January 2015, and left office in January 2023. A resident of Brewster, Massachusetts, he was elected as a Republican to represent the 1st Barnstable district.

Whelan is a former state police sergeant.

See also
 2019–2020 Massachusetts legislature
 2021–2022 Massachusetts legislature

References

External links
 Legislative website
 Campaign website

Republican Party members of the Massachusetts House of Representatives
People from Brewster, Massachusetts
Living people
American state police officers
21st-century American politicians
Year of birth missing (living people)